Vöcklamarkt (Central Bavarian: Vöcklamoakt) is a municipality in the district of Vöcklabruck in the Austrian state of Upper Austria.

Population

Transport
The town is served by Vöcklamarkt railway station.

References

Cities and towns in Vöcklabruck District